The 2016 FIBA Africa U18 Women's Championship (alternatively the Afrobasket U18) will be the 14th U-18 FIBA Africa championship, played under the auspices of the Fédération Internationale de Basketball, the world basketball sport governing body. The tournament will be held from August 26 – September 4 in Cairo, Egypt and contested by 8 national teams.

The tournament qualified the winner and the runner-up for the 2017 FIBA Under-19 Women's Basketball World Cup.

Venue 
 Cairo Stadium Indoor Halls Complex, Cairo

Draw

Squads

Format
The Preliminary Phase of the tournament will be played in a round robin format with each team taking over its opponent respectively. The top four teams from each group will advance to the Final Phase, played in a knockout format from the Quarter-Finals onwards (Semi-Finals and Final).

Preliminary round
The draw for the tournament was held on 25 August 2016 at the Le Passage Hotel in Cairo, Egypt.
All times are local (UTC+2).

Group A

Group B

Note: Ivory Coast withdrew form the 2016 FIBA Africa Under-18 Championship for Women.

Knockout stage

Bracket

Quarterfinals

5–8th place semifinals

Semifinals

Final classification games

Seventh place match

Fifth place match

Third place match

Final

Awards

All-Tournament Team

 Silvia Veloso
 Nesma Khalifa
 Meral Abdelgawad
 Adama Coulibaly
 Aminata Diakite

Final standings

References

External links
Official website

2016
2016 in African basketball
2016 in women's basketball
2016 in Egyptian sport
International basketball competitions hosted by Egypt
2016 in youth sport